Touro University may refer to:
 Touro University, New York, the main university
 Touro University System or the schools within it:
 Touro University California, a medical, pharmacy and physician assistant's school in Vallejo, California, US
 Touro University Nevada, a medical, pharmacy and nursing school in Henderson, Nevada, US
 Touro University Worldwide, the online branch of the Touro University System with offices in Los Alamitos, California, US
 Touro University College of Medicine, a proposed medical school disbanded in 2009